A large number of Soviet citizens of various ethnicities collaborated with Nazi Germany during World War II. It is estimated that the number of Soviet collaborators with the Nazi German military was around 1 million.

Aftermath of the German invasion

Mass scale collaboration was a result of the German invasion of the Soviet Union of 1941, Operation Barbarossa. The two main forms of mass collaboration in the Nazi-occupied territories were both military in nature. It is estimated that anywhere between 600,000 and 1,400,000 Soviets (Russians and non-Russians) joined the Wehrmacht forces as Hiwis (or Hilfswillige) in the initial stages of Barbarossa, including 275,000 to 350,000 “Muslim and Caucasian” volunteers and conscripts, ahead of the subsequent implementation of the more oppressive administrative methods by the SS. As much as 20% of the German manpower in Soviet Russia was composed of former Soviet citizens, about half of which were ethnic Russians. The Ukrainian collaborationist forces comprised an estimated 180,000 volunteers serving with units scattered all over Europe. The second type of mass collaboration were the indigenous security formations (majority ethnic Russian) running into hundreds of thousands and possibly more than 1 million (250,000 volunteers in the East Legions alone). Military collaboration – wrote Alex Alexiev – took place in truly unprecedented numbers suggesting that, more often than not, the Germans were perceived at first as the lesser of two evils by Soviet non-Russians.

Russian collaborationism 
 First Russian National Army
 Unternehmen Zeppelin
 Russian detachment of the 9th Army
 Zuyev Republic

Russian Liberation Movement 

 Committee for the Liberation of the Peoples of Russia (KONR)
 Russian Liberation Army (ROA)
 National Alliance of Russian Solidarists (NTS), actively involved in the Russian Liberation Movement, although opposed the Nazis. NTS contributed to ROA, and some of the ROA leading figres, like Fyodor Truhin, were important members of NTS.
 Russian National People's Army (RNNA)
 Russian Protective Corps
 Russian People's Labour Party (RTNP)

RONA and Lokot Autonomy 

The Russian Liberation People's Army (Русская освободительная национальная армия, РОНА; in Latin, RONA), later reformed as SS Sturmbrigade "RONA" and nicknamed the "Kaminski Brigade" after its commander, SS-Brigadefuhrer Bronislav Kaminski, was a collaborationist force originally formed from a Nazi-led militia unit in the "Lokot Republic" (Lokot Autonomy), a small puppet regime set up by the Germans to see if a Russian puppet government would be reliable. Kaminski and the leader of the government and the founder of "", killed by partisans in 1942, formed a unit that had a strength of 10,000—15,000. As the Red Army advanced, the Kaminski troops were forced to retreat into Belarus, and then into Poland in 1944. There, the RONA was reorganized into an SS brigade, the majority of which were Russians, with the rest comprising other Soviet ethnicities including Ukrainians, Belarusians and Azerbaijanis. In August, 1,700 brigade troops under Major Yuri Frolov were sent to Warsaw to quell an uprising. During it, the RONA troops became infamous for their atrocities, committing murder, rape, and theft. Some were reported to have left the combat zone with carts full of stolen goods. About 400 soldiers were lost in combat, including Frolov.

At the end of August, Bronislav Kaminski was killed. His death was surrounded with mystery as, while official records state that he was killed by Polish partisans, it is believed that Kaminski was executed by the SS. The reasons are thought to be his unit's war crimes and/or now that Heinrich Himmler supported the Russian Liberation Army of General Andrey Vlasov, he wanted to eliminate a potential rival. The rest of the brigade was reformed into the 29th SS Waffen Grenadier Division "RONA", which was disbanded in November 1944. Its remaining 3,000–4,000 members were sent to join Vlasov's army.

Ukrainian collaborationism

Political formations 
Ukrainian National Government (OUN-B)
 (headed by Mykola Velychkivsky; OUN-M)
 (headed by Volodymyr Kubijovyč)
Ukrainian National Committee

Ukrainian police and military formations 
14th Waffen Grenadier Division of the SS (1st Galician)
Nachtigall Battalion
Roland Battalion
Ukrainian Auxiliary Police
Ukrainian Legion of Self-Defense
Ukrainian Liberation Army
Ukrainian National Army, headed by Ukrainian National Committee
Ukrainian People's Militsiya
Ukrainian Insurgent Army (UPA)

Belarusian collaborationism 

 
 Belarusian Independence Party
 Zuyev Republic

Generalbezirk Weissruthenien 
 Belorusian Auxiliary Police
 Belarusian Central Council
 Byelorussian Home Defence
 Union of Belarusian Youth
 Belarus Newspaper

Other

Cossacks 
 1st Cossack Cavalry Division
 XV SS Cossack Cavalry Corps

Eastern Europe and Asia 
 162nd Turkestan Division
 Armenische Legion
 Aserbaidschanische Legion
 Georgische Legion (1941–45)
 Kaukasisch-Mohammedanische Legion
 Kalmykian Cavalry Corps
 Tatar Legions
 Turkestan Legion
 Idel Ural Legion

See also 
 Collaboration with the Axis Powers
 Wehrmacht foreign volunteers and conscripts
 Waffen-SS foreign volunteers and conscripts
 Reichskommissariat Moskowien initially Reichskommissariat Russland
 Reichskommissariat Ukraine
 Reichskommissariat Ostland
 German atrocities committed against Soviet prisoners of war

References

Further reading
 Bibliography of Poland during World War II
 Bibliography of the Soviet Union during World War II
 

Foreign volunteer units of the Wehrmacht
Russian collaborators with Nazi Germany
Nazi war crimes in the Soviet Union